A prostate tissue biopsy is a medical procedure in which a sample of tissue is taken from the prostate gland for diagnostic purposes. The prostate gland can be accessed through the perineum, the skin between the scrotum and anus. There are several different methods for performing this type of biopsy, with the PrecisionPoint method being considered the safest and most accurate.

Previously, transperineal biopsies were less common because they were more difficult and time-consuming to perform, requiring a surgical room, a medical team, and full anesthesia. However, recent technological advancements have made transperineal biopsies easier to perform.

PrecisionPoint 

The PrecisionPoint method uses real-time magnetic resonance imaging (MRI) to guide the placement of the biopsy needle, increasing the accuracy of the procedure. It also accesses the anterior region of the prostate, where over 90% of missed cancer can be found. In addition, PrecisionPoint biopsies only require two punctures of the perineum, reducing the risk of infection compared to other transperineal biopsy methods. They can also be performed in a medical office, making them more convenient for the patient, and are generally less painful.

Differences in Biopsies 

Prostate biopsies can be performed using either the transrectal or transperineal approach. Transrectal biopsies, the more common type, involve inserting a needle through the rectum to obtain tissue samples. However, they may not accurately sample the entire prostate, increasing the risk of missed diagnoses, and have a higher risk of infection due to the insertion through the rectum. In addition, the rectum can obstruct the view of the prostate, making it more difficult to obtain accurate tissue samples.

Transperineal biopsies, on the other hand, offer several advantages, including greater accuracy, a lower risk of infection, and better visualization of the prostate. The patient may be given a mild sedative and the perineum will be numbed with a local anesthetic. For PrecisionPoint biopsies, real-time MRI is used to guide the placement of the biopsy needle, while only two punctures are required. For other transperineal biopsy methods, a needle is used to obtain tissue samples in a similar manner, often requiring more punctures of the skin. The tissue samples are then sent to a laboratory for analysis.

Results 

The results of the biopsy will be used to diagnose any conditions or abnormalities present in the prostate gland. The procedure may be repeated if necessary to obtain additional tissue samples or to monitor the progression of any conditions.

Biopsy
Prostatic procedures